Albert Louis-Jean, Jr. (born October 13, 1993) is an American football cornerback for the Northern Arizona Wranglers. He played college football at Boston College. He has been a member of the Chicago Bears, Washington Redskins, Miami Dolphins and Ottawa Redblacks.

Early years
Louis-Jean played high school football at Brockton High School in Brockton, Massachusetts. He was selected to the 2010 Massachusetts High School Coaches Association Super 26 All-State Team, earned Boston Globe and Boston Herald All-Scholastic honors, was a two-time Brockton Enterprise All-Scholastic choice and was team MVP as a senior defensive back. He recorded 60 tackles and five interceptions as a senior. He also had 30 receptions for 650 yards and five touchdowns in 2010, completing his career with 12 interceptions. He also played basketball and track.

College career
Louis-Jean originally committed to play for the Miami Hurricanes, but eventually de-committed and instead decided to commit to play for Boston College. Louis-Jean played for the Eagles from 2011 to 2013. He sat out the 2012 season. After his junior season, and with two years of NCAA eligibility remaining, Louis-Jean decided to forgo his college career and declared for the 2014 NFL Draft.

Professional career

Chicago Bears
Louis-Jean signed with the Chicago Bears on June 2, 2014, after going undrafted in the 2014 NFL Draft. He was released by the Bears on August 30, 2014. On September 1, 2014, Louis-Jean signed to the team's practice squad. He was promoted to the active roster on October 7, 2014. On February 4, 2015, he signed a two-year contract extensions with the Bears. Louis-Jean was released by the Bears on August 30, 2015.

Washington Redskins
Louis-Jean was signed to the Washington Redskins' practice squad on January 5, 2016. He signed a futures contract on January 11, 2016. He was released by the team on May 2, 2016.

Miami Dolphins
Louis-Jean signed with the Miami Dolphins on August 8, 2016. On August 27, 2016, he was waived by the Dolphins.

Ottawa Redblacks 
On March 1, 2017 Louis-Jean signed with the Ottawa Redblacks of the Canadian Football League (CFL). He was released by the Redblacks on May 28, 2017.

Massachusetts Pirates
Louis-Jean signed with the Massachusetts Pirates of the National Arena League for the 2019 season. Louis-Jean appeared in 8 games while recording 9 tackles and 1 pass defensed.

In November 2019, Louis-Jean re-signed with the Pirates for the 2020 season.

References

External links
NFL Draft Scout
Chicago Bears bio

Living people
1993 births
American football defensive backs
Canadian football defensive backs
American players of Canadian football
African-American players of American football
Boston College Eagles football players
Chicago Bears players
Washington Redskins players
Miami Dolphins players
Ottawa Redblacks players
Players of American football from Massachusetts
Sportspeople from Brockton, Massachusetts
21st-century African-American sportspeople